1902 in sports describes the year's events in world sport.

American football
College championship
 Rose Bowl (1901 season):
 The Michigan Wolverines won 49–0 over the Stanford Indians to win the college football national championship
 Michigan Wolverines – college football national championship

Professional championships
 National Football League champions – Pittsburgh Stars
 Ohio League champions – Akron East Ends

Events
 1 January — inaugural Rose Bowl game is played at Pasadena, California
 September — the first professional football league, the National Football League (1902), which is unrelated to the current NFL, is formed from three teams based in Pennsylvania and who are backed by Major League Baseball. The league folds a few months later.
 21 November — the Philadelphia Football Athletics defeated the Kanaweola Athletic Club of Elmira, New York, 39–0, in the first ever professional American football night game.
 29 November — the Pittsburgh Stars defeated the Philadelphia Football Athletics, 11–0, at the Pittsburgh Coliseum, to win the 1902 National Football League championship.
 28 December — the Syracuse Athletic Club defeated the New York Philadelphians, 5–0, in the first indoor professional American football game, which was held at Madison Square Garden.

Association football
Brazil
 Fluminense FC was founded in Laranjeiras area, Rio de Janeiro.
England
 The Football League – Sunderland 44 points, Everton 41, Newcastle United 37, Blackburn Rovers 36, Nottingham Forest 35, Derby County 35
 FA Cup final – Sheffield United 2–1 Southampton at Crystal Palace, London (replay following 1–1 draw at Crystal Palace)
 26 April — shortly after being saved from bankruptcy, Newton Heath changes its name to Manchester United
Scotland
 Scottish Football League – Rangers
 Scottish Cup final – Hibernian 1–0 Celtic at Celtic Park
Spain
 10 March — foundation of Real Madrid as Madrid Fútbol Club

Athletics
 Sammy Mellor wins the sixth running of the Boston Marathon.

Australian rules football
VFL Premiership
 Collingwood wins the 6th VFL Premiership: Collingwood 9.6 (60) d Essendon 3.9 (27) at Melbourne Cricket Ground (MCG)
 With a handful of exceptions, all VFL/AFL Grand Finals are played at the MCG from 1902

Baseball
National championship
 National League championship – Pittsburgh Pirates
 American League championship – Philadelphia Athletics 
Events
 23 April — infielder Lou Castro debuts with the Philadelphia Athletics in the American League as the first Latin-American to play in Major League Baseball
 Winnipeg Maroons wins the inaugural Northern League Championship in the minor leagues

Boxing
Events
 Joe Gans wins the World Lightweight Championship by knocking out Frank Erne in the first round.  Gans successfully defends the title five times by the end of the year.
 25 July — James J. Jeffries defeats Bob Fitzsimmons by an eighth-round knockout in San Francisco, Fitzsimmons failing in his bid to recover the World Heavyweight Championship
Lineal world champions
 World Heavyweight Championship – James J. Jeffries
 World Middleweight Championship – Tommy Ryan
 World Welterweight Championship – Barbados Joe Walcott
 World Lightweight Championship – Frank Erne → Joe Gans
 World Featherweight Championship – Young Corbett II
 World Bantamweight Championship – Harry Forbes

Cricket
Events
 No cricket is played in South Africa due to the Boer War.
 Australia defeats England in The Ashes by 2 Tests to 1 after the first two Tests have been rained off. In one of the most famous Test series in history, the final three matches are full of drama with Victor Trumper scoring a century before lunch in the Third Test, Australia winning the Fourth Test by just 3 runs and England winning the Fifth Test by one wicket following a century in only 75 minutes by Gilbert Jessop.
England
 County Championship – Yorkshire
 Minor Counties Championship – Wiltshire
 Most runs – Victor Trumper 2570 @ 48.49 (HS 128)
 Most wickets – Wilfred Rhodes 213 @ 13.15 (BB 8–26)  
 Wisden Cricketers of the Year – Warwick Armstrong, Cuthbert Burnup, James Iremonger, James Kelly, Victor Trumper
Australia
 Sheffield Shield – New South Wales
 Most runs – Clem Hill 1035 @ 51.75 (HS 107)  
 Most wickets – Len Braund 62 @ 28.69 (BB 6–90)
India
 Bombay Presidency – Europeans shared with Parsees
South Africa
 Currie Cup – not contested
West Indies
 Inter-Colonial Tournament – not contested

Figure skating
World Figure Skating Championships
 World Men's Champion – Ulrich Salchow (Sweden)

Golf
Major tournaments
 British Open – Sandy Herd
 US Open – Laurie Auchterlonie, who becomes the first golfer to break 80 in all four rounds of the US Open
Other tournaments
 British Amateur – Charles Hutchings
 US Amateur – Louis N. James

Horse racing
England
 Grand National – Shannon Lass
 1,000 Guineas Stakes – Sceptre
 2,000 Guineas Stakes – Sceptre
 The Derby – Ard Patrick
 The Oaks – Sceptre
 St. Leger Stakes – Sceptre
Australia
 Melbourne Cup – The Victory
Canada
 King's Plate – Lyddite
Ireland
 Irish Grand National – Patlander
 Irish Derby Stakes – St. Brendan
USA
 Kentucky Derby – Alan-a-Dale
 Preakness Stakes – Old England
 Belmont Stakes – Masterman

Ice hockey
Stanley Cup
 Winnipeg Victorias successfully defends the Stanley Cup, defeating Toronto Wellingtons in a Cup challenge by two games to nil in a best-of-three series
 March – Winnipeg Victorias wins the Manitoba Hockey Association championship to retain the Stanley Cup
 1 March — Montreal HC wins the Canadian Amateur Hockey League (CAHL) championship and challenges Winnipeg
 13–17 March — Montreal and Winnipeg play a best-of-three series for the Stanley Cup, Montreal winning by two games to one to claim the Stanley Cup for the first time since 1894

Motor racing
Paris-Vienna Trail
 The Paris-Vienna Trail is run on 26–29 June over 990 km and won by Marcel Renault (France) driving a Renault in a time of 15:47:43.  The race is in retrospect sometimes referred to as the VII Grand Prix de l'ACF.
Gordon Bennett Cup
 The third Gordon Bennett Cup is run from Paris to Innsbruck and won by Selwyn Edge (Great Britain) driving a Napier 30hp.
Circuit des Ardennes
 The inaugural Circuit des Ardennes is run on 31 July 1902 in the vicinity of Bastogne.  The total distance is 512.05 km (i.e., 85.34 km x 6 laps).  The winner is Charles Jarrott (Great Britain), driving a Panhard-Levassor 70 hp in a time of 5:53:39.
Great Britain
 The first motor race in Great Britain is held at Bexhill-on-Sea with more than 200 entries.

Rowing
The Boat Race
 22 March — Cambridge wins the 59th Oxford and Cambridge Boat Race

Rugby league
Events
 Featherstone Rovers founded
England
 Championship – Broughton Rangers
 Challenge Cup final – Broughton Rangers 25–0 Salford at Athletic Grounds, Rochdale
 Lancashire League Championship – Wigan
 Yorkshire League Championship – Leeds

Rugby union
Home Nations Championship
 20th Home Nations Championship series is won by Wales

Speed skating
Speed Skating World Championships
 Men's All-round Champion – none declared

Tennis
England
 Wimbledon Men's Singles Championship – Laurence Doherty (GB) defeats Arthur Gore (GB) 6–4 6–3 3–6 6–0
 Wimbledon Women's Singles Championship – Muriel Robb (GB) defeats Charlotte Cooper Sterry (GB) 7–5 6–1
France
 French Men's Singles Championship – Michel Vacherot (France) defeats Max Decugis (France) 6–4 6–2
 French Women's Singles Championship – Françoise Masson (France) defeats P. Girod (France): details unknown
USA
 American Men's Singles Championship – William Larned (USA) defeats Reginald Doherty (GB) 4–6 6–2 6–4 8–6
 American Women's Singles Championship – Marion Jones (USA) defeats Elisabeth Moore (USA) 6–1 1–0 retired
Davis Cup
 1902 International Lawn Tennis Challenge –  3–2  at Crescent Athletic Club (grass) Brooklyn, United States

References

 
Sports by year